Jesse Lee Peterson (born May 22, 1949) is an American conservative radio host, pastor, and broadcaster. He is the founder of Brotherhood Organization of a New Destiny (BOND), a Christian ministry, and hosts the programs The Jesse Lee Peterson Radio Show and The Fallen State TV. He has gained notoriety for his political views, which have been described as misogynistic, homophobic, anti-black and white supremacist.

Early life
Peterson was born on May 22, 1949, in Midway, Alabama, and raised in Corner Hill by his grandparents, who worked on the Comer family plantation where his great-grandparents had been enslaved a century earlier. His mother and father moved to Gary, Indiana, and East Chicago, Indiana, respectively, where they separately started new families of their own. He was born with a cleft palate that was not repaired until his teens. Peterson lived with his mother and stepfather in Gary as a teenager, briefly attending Edison High School. He then returned to Alabama and graduated from high school before moving to Los Angeles. He attended Los Angeles City College for one year. He says that he started his own janitorial service in 1989.

Political involvement

Peterson has stated that he used to be a Democrat but became a Republican in his late 30s. He attributed the change to his Christian beliefs.

In 1990, Peterson founded BOND (Brotherhood Organization of a New Destiny), later registered as a religious non-profit. BOND has close ties to the Tea Party movement. Advisory board members include Sean Hannity and Dennis Prager.

Peterson has participated in activism against illegal immigration, abortion, and gun control, and for conservative family values. He has protested against the NAACP and feminist lawyer Gloria Allred. He has participated in discussions at the annual political convention Politicon.

From 1999 to 2004, Peterson chose Martin Luther King Jr. Day to hold a "National Day of Repudiation of Jesse Jackson" to highlight his opposition to Jackson, who was near King when he was assassinated.

In 2001, while meeting with Toyota executives in Los Angeles, Peterson accused Jackson of threatening him and his son Jonathan Jackson of assaulting him. In 2006, a jury cleared Jesse Jackson of the threat allegation, but was split on his son's assault allegation. Conservative organization Judicial Watch provided attorneys for Peterson in the lawsuit.

In 2002, Peterson debated Michael Eric Dyson on "The Case For/Against Reparations for African Americans," hosted by the National Association of Black Journalists.

Conservative talk radio host Dennis Prager wrote the forewords to two of Peterson's books.

Peterson's radio show was simulcast on Newsmax TV in 2017-2018.

In June 2019, video-sharing platform YouTube demonetized Peterson's channel, amongst many others, under an updated hate speech policy.

Peterson appears in the 2020 political documentary Uncle Tom, produced by radio host Larry Elder.

In 2022, Peterson gave a speech at the third America First Political Action Conference (AFPAC), which was also attended by Nick Fuentes and Marjorie Taylor Greene. AFPAC has been described as a white nationalist political action committee. The Anti-Defamation League described Peterson's speech as the "one of the most racist" of all delivered at the event, in which he described black people as the destroyers of America.

Political views
Peterson condemns the Democratic Party, opposes Muslims serving in government, and says that racism does not exist. Instead, he believes that every conflict is a spiritual "battle between good and evil". He has spoken out against Kwanzaa and Black History Month.

Peterson's views have been described by various authors as being consistent with white supremacy, and it has been suggested that white nationalists are encouraged by his rhetoric and compelled to promote him, because Peterson's blackness reduces the shock value of opinions that would be considered outrageous if a white person had expressed them.

In 2005, he suggested that most African Americans stranded in New Orleans during Hurricane Katrina were relying on the government to save them. In 2012, Peterson said about black unemployment, "One of the things that I would do is take all black people back to the South and put them on the plantation.... They need a good hard education on what it is to work."

He has called Nobel Peace Prize winner Nelson Mandela an "evil man" and said that South Africa was better off under apartheid. In 2020, he called then-U.S. President Donald Trump "the Great White Hope".

Peterson opposes sex outside marriage. During an interview with former SlutWalk organizer Amber Rose, Peterson responded to the question "if women are sluts what does that make you?" by stating men are "slut makers".

Peterson stated in a 2012 sermon that "one of the greatest mistakes America made was to allow women the opportunity to vote." He stated that women "can't handle power in the right way", that they "have no patience", and "don't have love". Political analyst Kirsten Powers confronted Peterson on Sean Hannity's program on Fox News, accusing him of using his status as a pastor to preach hatred and fear of women.

In 2013, Peterson called Trayvon Martin a "thug". CNN host Piers Morgan called Peterson's comments "quite offensive".

In 2015 on right-wing commentator Sean Hannity's show, Peterson defended Michael Slager, a white former North Charleston, South Carolina police officer who killed Walter Lamar Scott, an unarmed black man by shooting him in the back. Peterson criticized "angry black folks in this country" who disobey instructions of police, while Hannity pushed back against Peterson and called the killing "cold-blooded". Upset, fellow panelist Leo Terrell abruptly walked out of the interview prematurely. In 2017, Slager was sentenced to 20 years in prison for the killing.

In 2018, Peterson compared the Black Lives Matter movement to the Ku Klux Klan, saying that each could be described as an "agitative organization founded by... black lesbians and homosexuals." In response, Good Morning Britain host Piers Morgan accused Peterson of homophobia, and Peterson's microphone was muted before he was kicked off the show.

In 2019, Peterson called activist Andrew Yang a "communist" and "beta male" for his universal basic income proposal. Peterson said Yang, an American born in New York, "should go back to China or wherever he came from."

In 2019, a person who was considering marrying a woman who had a previous child conceived by rape called Peterson's radio show and was told by Peterson: "Do not marry a woman...who already has children. It's bad enough on kids when they don't have both parents, it's worse when a so-called step-parent steps in ... they want their natural father and natural mother, and especially their natural father."

Peterson's views on women have been described as misogynist. in 2012, during a web sermon broadcast by his ministry (BOND), Paterson said “I think that one of the greatest mistakes that America made was to allow women the opportunity to vote. We should've never turned it over to women.”

Personal life 
Peterson has one son. He has been engaged twice but never married.

2022 homosexuality allegations
On 13 July 2022, Church Militant, a conservative Catholic news and commentary site, published allegations of Peterson engaging in same-sex relationships, citing interviews with two former male associates.

Published works 
 From Rage to Responsibility: Black Conservative Jesse Lee Peterson and America Today, with Dennis Prager and Brad Stetson. Paragon House, 2000, 
 SCAM: How the Black Leadership Exploits Black America, WND Books, . Reprinted, Thomas Nelson, 2005, 
The Seven Guaranteed Steps to Spiritual, Family and Financial Success, 2007.
 The ANTIDOTE: Healing America from the Poison of Hate, Blame and Victimhood, WND Books,  (hardcover), 2015.

References

External links

 
 Brotherhood Organization of a New Destiny (BOND)
 

1949 births
Living people
20th-century African-American people
20th-century American male writers
20th-century American non-fiction writers
20th-century evangelicals
21st-century African-American people
21st-century American male writers
21st-century American non-fiction writers
21st-century evangelicals
Activists from Alabama
Activists from California
African-American non-fiction writers
African-American television talk show hosts
Alabama Republicans
American columnists
American conspiracy theorists
American critics of Islam
American evangelicals
American male non-fiction writers
American nationalists
American radio personalities
American self-help writers
American television evangelists
American television talk show hosts
Black conservatism in the United States
Christian critics of Islam
Christians from Alabama
Christians from California
Christians from Indiana
Critics of Black Lives Matter
Evangelical writers
Journalists from Alabama
Los Angeles City College alumni
Male critics of feminism
Newsmax TV people
People from Barbour County, Alabama
People from Midway, Alabama
Writers from Gary, Indiana
Writers from Los Angeles